Downlands Community School is a maintained comprehensive for pupils aged 11 to 16. It currently caters for around 1200 pupils. In November 2016, Ofsted inspected the school and reported that the school was 'Outstanding' in all areas.

Location
The school is located in the West Sussex village of Hassocks, and has been considerably enlarged in the recent past with the addition of a new math block, sports hall and generation three AstroTurf open air training pitch. The sports hall and astro turf pitch are managed, on behalf of the school, by Freedom Leisure and are extensively used by the local community after school hours.

Staff and governors
The current headteacher of the school is Mr Mark Wignall and the Chair of Governors is Di Hunt.

Academic achievement
In 2016 the school achieved 76% of pupils with the equivalent of 5 or more GCSEs grade C or above including English and Maths.

References

External links

Community schools in West Sussex
Secondary schools in West Sussex